This is a list of units from the State of Alabama that fought in the U.S. Army during the American Civil War (1861–1865):

See also 

 List of American Civil War units by state
 Alabama Civil War Confederate Units
 Alabama in the American Civil War
 Southern Unionists
 United States Colored Troops

Footnotes

References 
 
 National Park Service Civil War Soldiers and Sailors Website

 
Alabama
Civil War regiments